Cameron Bayly (born 11 October 1990) is an Australian professional racing cyclist. He won the mountains classification of the 2015 Herald Sun Tour and the third stage of the 2016 Tour of Taihu Lake.

Major results

2014
 3rd Overall Tour de Kumano
 8th Overall Tour of Japan
 8th Overall Tour de Korea
2015
 1st  Mountains classification Herald Sun Tour
2016
 1st Stage 3 Tour of Taihu Lake
 5th Overall Bałtyk–Karkonosze Tour
 7th Overall Tour of Japan
 9th Overall Tour of Thailand
 10th Tour of Yancheng Coastal Wetlands
2017
 2nd Overall Tour de Langkawi
 2nd Grand Prix de la ville de Pérenchies
 6th Overall Tour of China I
2018
 1st Stage 4 Tour de Taiwan

References

External links
 

1990 births
Living people
Australian male cyclists
Place of birth missing (living people)